Efrén Alexander Mera Moreira (born June 23, 1985), nicknamed "the Pup", is an Ecuadorian football attacking midfielder currently playing for Deportivo Cuenca of the Ecuadorian first division league.

Sources
 https://archive.today/20130129140210/http://www.mantafutbolclub.com/2012/01/12/gracias-por-todo-efren-mera/

External links
 Ficha del Jugador
 ECUAGOL

1985 births
Living people
People from Manta, Ecuador
Association football midfielders
Ecuadorian footballers
Manta F.C. footballers
L.D.U. Loja footballers
C.S. Emelec footballers
C.D. Universidad Católica del Ecuador footballers
Delfín S.C. footballers
C.S.D. Independiente del Valle footballers